Doctor Ox's Experiment can refer to:

Dr. Ox's Experiment, a novella by Jules Verne
Le docteur Ox, an opera by Jacques Offenbach based on the Verne novella.
Doctor Ox's Experiment (opera), an opera by Gavin Bryars based on the Verne novella